Tiemen Groen (6 July 1946 – 26 October 2021) was a Dutch cyclist who won four consecutive world titles in the 4 km individual pursuit in 1964–1967;  His sporting career began with DTS Zaandam. He finished fourth in this event at the 1964 Summer Olympics. He also won a silver medal in the team time trial at the 1966 UCI Road World Championships. He retired shortly after turning professional in 1967.

Groen moved in 1995 to South Africa. He died on 26 October 2021, at the age of 75.

References

1946 births
2021 deaths
Olympic cyclists of the Netherlands
Cyclists at the 1964 Summer Olympics
Dutch male cyclists
People from De Fryske Marren
UCI Track Cycling World Champions (men)
UCI Road World Championships cyclists for the Netherlands
Cyclists from Friesland
Dutch track cyclists
Dutch emigrants to South Africa
20th-century Dutch people